Noored kotkad (released in 1927) is an Estonian silent film about the Estonian War of Independence that was fought between 1918–1920.

It was filmed in 1927 in Tartu, Mustvee, Värska, and Tartu County. The film was digitally restored in 2008 by Taska Productions and Digital Film Finland.

Cast
 Arnold Vaino as Tammekänd
 Juhan Nõmmik as Laansoo
 Ruut Tarmo as Lepik 
 Elli Põder-Roht as Hilja
 Amalie Konsa as Laansoo's mother
 Aksella Luts as Forest-guard's daughter
 Rudolf Ratassepp as Red Army commissar
 Olev Reintalu as Red Army commissar
 Vambola Kurg as Estonian military leader
 Juhan Sütiste as Estonian military leader (as Johannes Schütz)
 August Sunne as Doctor

External links
 
 Noored kotkad. Official site.

1927 films
Estonian war drama films
Silent films
Estonian black-and-white films